Mathieu Heijboer (born 4 February 1982 in Dordrecht) is a Dutch professional road bicycle racer.

Palmares 

 Chrono Champenois (2005)
 Boucles de la Mayenne - Prologue (2005)
 Mainfranken Tour (2004)

External links 
Profile at Cofidis official website 

Dutch male cyclists
1982 births
Living people
Sportspeople from Dordrecht
Cyclists from South Holland
20th-century Dutch people
21st-century Dutch people